Carrot River may refer to:

Carrot River (Saskatchewan), a river in Canada
Carrot River, Saskatchewan, a town in Canada
Carrot River 29A, an Indian reserve in Canada